Slippery Silks is a 1936 short subject directed by Preston Black starring American slapstick comedy team The Three Stooges (Moe Howard, Larry Fine and Curly Howard). It is the 19th entry in the series released by Columbia Pictures starring the comedians, who released 190 shorts for the studio between 1934 and 1959.

Plot
The Stooges are furniture makers hired to duplicate a priceless antique Chinese cabinet on loan for a $50,000 bond from a local museum to a Mr. Morgan (Vernon Dent). Once the inept Stooges set to work, the valuable cabinet is quickly cut in half by Curly by accident, and accidentally smashed to pieces by Moe, and the trio barely escape from the enraged Mr. Morgan who threatens to kill the trio. While on the run, the boys learn that they have inherited a fancy dress boutique, the Madame de France, from their recently deceased Uncle Pete. They enter the fashion business, designing women's fashions which resemble the furniture they built when they were carpenters. They are hired to put on a fashion show by a woman who turns out to be Morgan's wife, Mrs. Morgan Morgan (Symona Boniface). When Mr. Morgan arrives, he recognizes the Stooges as the vandals who destroyed his cabinet, and pummels Curly vigorously. Moe throws a pastry but misses his target and hits one of the fashion show guests; more cream puffs are hurled and soon the entire room is engaged in a free-for-all. The fight ends when three women knock the Stooges unconscious with mannequin legs.

Production notes
Slippery Silks was filmed on June 10–15, 1936. It marks the Stooges first bona fide pie/pastry fight. While the fight primarily consists of cream puffs, there is one pie launched during the melee when Curly accidentally steps in front of Moe's line of fire to grab a "lucky penny", and stands back up just in time to get hit in the face with a pie. The first short that featured a pie fight of sorts was in Pop Goes the Easel, in which sculptor's clay is thrown at unsuspecting targets.

Moe Howard stated in his autobiography that over 150 pies were thrown. In Moe's June 8, 1973 appearance on The Mike Douglas Show, he revealed to Douglas that, in making the Stooge pie-fight scenes, he was responsible for most of the pie-throwing. He remarked that "the studio auditors claimed (he) had saved them tens of thousands of dollars with my accuracy in the pie throw." The pie fight scenes were used in the Muppet Babies episode, "Good, Clean, Fun".

"Preston Black" was a pseudonym used for a time by Jack White (brother of producer Jules White), who had been in a nasty divorce and was trying to shield income from his ex-wife.

The ending theme of "Listen to the Mockingbird" features different instrumentation.

References

External links 
 
 
Slippery Silks at threestooges.net

1936 films
1936 comedy films
The Three Stooges films
American black-and-white films
Columbia Pictures short films
American slapstick comedy films
1930s English-language films
1930s American films